Nicholas of Osimo (Auximanus) (b. at Osimo, Italy, in the second half of the fourteenth century; d. at Rome, 1453) was an Italian Franciscan preacher and author.

Life

After having studied law, and taken the degree of doctor at Bologna, he joined the Friars Minor of the Observants in the convent of San Paolo. As companion of James of the Marches in Bosnia, and as Vicar-Provincial of Apulia (1439), Nicholas greatly contributed to the prosperity of the Observants for whom (1440) he obtained complete independence from the Conventuals, a privilege shortly after revoked according to the desire of Bernardino of Siena.

He was also appointed Visitator and afterwards Superior, of Palestine, but difficulties seem to have hindered him from the discharge of these offices.

Works

Nicholas wrote both in Latin and Italian a number of treatises on moral theology, the spiritual life, and on the Rule of St. Francis. They include:

"Supplementum Summae Magistratiae seu Pisanellae," a revised and increased edition of the Summa of Bartholomew of San Concordio(or of Pisa), O.P., completed at Milan, 1444, with many editions before the end of the fifteenth century: Venice, 1473 sqq.; Genoa, 1474; Milan, 1479; Reutlingen, 1483; Nuremberg, 1494.
 "Quadriga Spirituale," in Italian, treats in a popular way what the author considers the four principal means of salvation, viz. faith, good works, confession, and prayer. These are like the four wheels of a chariot, whence the name. The work was printed at Jesi, 1475, and under the name of St. Bernardine of Siena in 1494.

References

Attribution
 The entry cites:
Luke Wadding, Scriptores Ord. Min. (Rome, 1806), 179 (Rome, 1906), 176; 
, Annales Minorum ad an. 1427, n. 13-16, 2nd ed., X (Rome, 1734), 119-30; ad an. 1438, n. 21-23, XI (Rome, 1734), 39-46; ad an. 1440, n. 29, XI (Rome, 1734), 111 passim; 
Sbaralea, Supplementum (Rome, 1806), 550; 
SPEZI, Tre Operette volgari di Frate Niccolo da Osimo, testi di lingua inediti tratti da' codici Vaticani (Rome, 1865), preface; 
LUIGI DA FABRIANO, Cenni cronologico-biografici della Osservante Provincia Picena (Quaracchi, 1886), 161, 221;
HAIN, Repertorium Bibliographicum (Paris, 1826), I, i, n. 2149-75; 
VON SCHULTE, Die Geschichte der Quellen und Literatur des Canonischen Rechtes von Gratian bis auf die Gegenwart, I (Stuttgart, 1877), 435-37; 
DIETTERLE, Die Summae Confessorum in Zeitschrift fur Kirchengeschichte, ed. BRIEGER, XXVII (Gotha, 1906), 183-88

1453 deaths
Italian Friars Minor
Year of birth unknown